Kawaikini is the highest point on the Hawaiian Island of Kauai and in Kauai County and measures  in elevation.  It is the summit of the island's inactive central shield volcano, Mount Waialeale.  Other peaks on Kauai include: Waialeale (5,148 feet), Namolokama Mountain (4,421 feet), Kalalau Lookout (4,120 feet), Keanapuka Mountain (4,120 feet), Haupu (2,297 feet) and Nounou (1,241 feet).

Description 
A rain gauge placed on the nearby Waialeale lake records daily rainfall and regularly lands Kauai's peaks on the National Climatic Data Center's list of places averaging the highest annual rainfall.  This high rainfall makes reaching the summit difficult on most days.

The rain is not the only barrier to reaching Kawaikini.  The Alakai Wilderness Preserve is located to the west and its miles of dense, swampy forest limit access to the summit.  To the north, east, and south, Kawaikini is protected by steep, wet cliffs.

Etymology 
Ka wai kini literally translates to "the multitudinous water" in the Hawaiian language, referring to the island's high rainfall.

See also

List of mountain peaks of the United States
List of volcanoes of the United States
List of mountain peaks of Hawaii
List of Ultras of Oceania
List of Ultras of the United States
Hawaii hotspot
Evolution of Hawaiian volcanoes
Hawaiian–Emperor seamount chain

References

External links
 "Kawaikini, Hawaii" on Peakbagger

Mountains of Hawaii
Landforms of Kauai